Rajgangpur is an industrial town situated in the Sundargarh District of Odisha. It is located 400 km to the north-west of the capital city, Bhubaneswar. It is located 30 km west of Rourkela. It is accessible by both road and rail. Rajgangpur Railway Station is on Mumbai-Rourkela line. Regular buses are available to Bhubaneswar, Cuttack, Rourkela and Angul. RGP Main Road is the main road of the town. The nearest functional airport is Veer Surendra Sai Airport, Jharsuguda which is approximately 95 km from Rajgangpur.  Places of tourist interest in the vicinity of Rajgangpur include Mandira Dam, Chhatri Hill, Darjeeng, Vedvyas and Khandahar.

History
Rajgangpur derived its name from the erstwhile princely state of Gangpur Estate. This town was transferred from Commissioner of Chhotanagpur to Odisha Division in the year 1905. Industrialization started in Rajgangpur with Dalmia Group setting up a cement plant in 1951.

Industry

Rajgangpur is a major industrial town alongside Rourkela in Sundargarh district. It is home to OCL Industrial Township where cement plants and other factories owned by Dalmia Bharat, Ltd. the flagship company of Dalmia Group are located. The cement plants are the largest owned by Dalmia. The Rourkela-Rajgangpur industrial belt has most of the huge, medium and small scale industrial units in the Sundargarh district.

Demographics
As of the 2011 India Rajgangpur had a population of 51,362 of which 26,259 are males while 25,103 are females. Rajgangpur has an average literacy rate of 84.32%, higher than the state average of 72.87%. In Rajagangpur, Male literacy is around 89.38 % while female literacy rate is 79.07 %. In Rajgangpur, 12.41% of the population is under 6 years of age.

The main language spoken by the inhabitants of this town are Oriya, Hindi, Urdu, Sadri. The main source of job creation in the town are the industries in and around the town.

Tribals
Rajgangpur has a large tribal population, dominated by Kisan, Gond, Oraons, Munda, Kharias and other tribals. Their main occupation is farming. The tribals also work in nearby factories and also hold a lot of government jobs. The tribal men and women are hardworking and they enjoy singing and dancing using Mandar, Dholki, Nagra and Muhuri. Education, medical facilities, clean drinking water and social justice are of major concern to the tribals, as they have scant access to these resources.

Festivals
People of different faiths stay in Rajgangpur (RGP) like Hindu, Christian, Muslim, Sikh. Some of the festivals that Hindus celebrate are Rath Yatra, Holi, Ganesh puja, Ramnavami, Durga puja, Janmastami, Mahavir Jayanti, Shivaratri, etc. Festivals celebrated by Christians include Christmas and Easter. The important festivals that Muslims celebrate are Id ul fitr (Id), Id ul zuha (Bakrid) & Id miladun nabi. Urs festival also celebrated at Lal Baba's Dargah

Medical
Rajgangpur Government Hospital is located in the heart of the town with ample facilities for patients. LVPEI opened OCL Eye Centre in 2015 to provide secondary level examination and treatment of all types of eye diseases.

Transport
Rajgangpur is well connected with Sundargarh and Rourkela through the State Highway No. 10 and is also well connected with the Odisha state capital Bhubaneswar. Rajgangpur is a station on the Tatanagar–Bilaspur section of Howrah-Nagpur-Mumbai line. Rourkela Airport is ready for commercial operation.

Entertainment
Currently there are five radio channels (four private and one government based) operating in Rajgangpur which has its radio stations in Rourkela. There is currently one single screen movie theater namely Milan Talkies, Subhas Chowk and another movie theater is under construction. There is also a Cable TV network in Rajgangpur named Satellite Club. Apart from these during various religious festivals plays are also held at town community centre and OCL colony auditorium.

Religious sites
Ghoghar Dham is a sacred place located 8 km towards north from Rajgangpur. It is famous for its Shiv Temple & Hilltop. In the month of Shravan a lot of pilgrims & kawadias visit the temple. The newly renovated Durga mandir is one of the best temple with its finest work of Glass Art. Dalmia Mandir located at the center of the town & managed by OCL India Ltd is a beautiful temple of Shiva, Ram, Laxman, Goddess Sita & Radha Krishna. It is surrounded by a beautiful flower park. There is a shrine of Lal Shah Baba on the main road near OCL gate. Every year Urs is celebrated with all fanfare. Devotees cut across religious line to commemorate this occasion. Beside this there are two churches too.
There is also a temple of Hanuman situated just beside the "Baba Talab".

Politics
Current MLA from Rajgangpur (ST) Assembly Constituency is Rajeen Ekka of INC, who won the seat in State elections in 2019. Previous MLAs from this seat include Gregory Minz of INC who won in 2004 and 2009, Mangala Kisan who won this seat representing BJD in 2000, 2014 and representing JD in 1995, 1990 and representing JNP in 1985, Mukharam Naik of INC(I) in 1980 and Brajamohan Kishan of JNP in 1977. Rajgangpur is part of Sundargarh (Lok Sabha constituency).

References

Cities and towns in Sundergarh district